The AF RMR Express (15055 / 15056) is an express train belonging to Indian Railways - North Eastern Railway zone that runs between Agra Fort and Ramnagar in India. Currently it is running three days in a week.

Schedule
The 15055 AF RMR Express leaves Agra Fort on Monday, Wednesday and Saturday at 13:05 hrs IST and reaches the Ramnagar at 00:15 hrs IST. Total journey time: 11 hrs and 10 minutes.

On return, the 15056 AF RMR Express leaves Ramnagar on Tuesday, Friday and Sunday at 17:50 hrs IST and reaches the Agra Fort at 05:00 hrs IST. Total journey time: 11 hrs and 10 minutes.

Route and halts
 Kashipur (KPV)
 Bajpur (BPZ)
 Lalkuan (LKU)
 Pantnagar (PBW)
 Kichha (KHH)
 Baheri (BHI)
 Izzatnagar (IZN)
 Bareilly City (BC)
 Bareilly (BE)
 Budaun (BEM)
 Ujhani (UJH)
 Soron (SRNK)
 Kasganj (KSJ)
 Sikandra Rao (SKA)
 Hathras City (HTC)
 Mathura Cantt (MRT)
 Mathura Junction (MTJ)
 Achhnera Junction (AH)
 Idgah (IDH)

Coach composition
 1 AC II Tier
 1 AC III Tier
 6 Sleeper Coaches
 6 General Unreserved
 2 Seating cum Luggage Rake

References

Trains from Agra
North Eastern Railway zone
Express trains in India